Hawkins is a city in Wood County, Texas, United States. The population was 1,274 at the 2020 census. It is located twenty miles north of the larger city of Tyler. Just east of the community is Jarvis Christian University, a historically black institution of higher learning.

History
A post office was established in Hawkins in 1873.

Geography

Hawkins is located at  (32.591694, –95.200936).
According to the United States Census Bureau, the city has a total area of 2.2 square miles (5.8 km), of which 2.2 square miles (5.8 km) is land and 0.44% is water.

Hawkins is located between Mineola (18 miles west of Hawkins) and Big Sandy (7 miles east) on U.S. Route 80. Most of Hawkins is along FM Road 14 which runs north and south. Quitman and the unincorporated community of Holly Lake Ranch are located to the north of Hawkins, while Interstate 20 and Tyler can be reached by traveling south from Hawkins on FM 14.

Climate

The climate in this area is characterized by hot, humid summers and generally mild to cool winters.  According to the Köppen Climate Classification system, Hawkins has a humid subtropical climate, abbreviated "Cfa" on climate maps.

Demographics

As of the 2020 United States census, there were 1,274 people, 562 households, and 320 families residing in the city.

As of the census of 2000, there were 1,331 people, 492 households, and 358 families residing in the city. The population density was 593.1 people per square mile (229.4/km). There were 558 housing units at an average density of 248.6 per square mile (96.2/km). The racial makeup of the city was 82.79% White, 16.08% African American, 0.15% Native American, 0.23% from other races, and 0.75% from two or more races. Hispanic or Latino of any race were 0.98% of the population.

There were 492 households, out of which 34.3% had children under the age of 18 living with them, 53.9% were married couples living together, 14.8% had a female householder with no husband present, and 27.2% were non-families. 24.0% of all households were made up of individuals, and 13.4% had someone living alone who was 65 years of age or older. The average household size was 2.56 and the average family size was 3.05.

In the city, the population was spread out, with 26.0% under the age of 18, 8.3% from 18 to 24, 23.1% from 25 to 44, 25.4% from 45 to 64, and 17.1% who were 65 years of age or older. The median age was 39 years. For every 100 females, there were 78.9 males. For every 100 females age 18 and over, there were 76.2 males.

The median income for a household in the city was $32,543, and the median income for a family was $36,985. Males had a median income of $31,607 versus $19,800 for females. The per capita income for the city was $14,833. About 12.3% of families and 17.2% of the population were below the poverty line, including 19.8% of those under age 18 and 32.3% of those age 65 or over.

Education
Hawkins is served by the Hawkins Independent School District.

Jarvis Christian University is located in unincorporated Wood County, Texas, east of Hawkins.

Notable people

 Mel Gabler, with Norma, launched a critique of public school textbooks from their kitchen table in Hawkins in 1961 before moving to Longview
 Norma Gabler, see Mel Gabler
 Lillian Richard, an African-American actress who played "Aunt Jemima"  for the Quaker Oats Company from 1925 to 1947, was born in Hawkins
 Stanley Richard, great-nephew of Lillian Richard, played in the National Football League in the 1990s

Area attractions
 Tyler State Park
 Lake Hawkins

References

Cities in Texas
Cities in Wood County, Texas
Populated places established in 1873
1873 establishments in Texas